Douglas Creek may refer to:

Douglas Creek (New York)
Douglas Creek (Washington state)